The canton of Flers-1 is an administrative division of the Orne department, northwestern France. It was created at the French canton reorganisation which came into effect in March 2015. Its seat is in Flers.

It consists of the following communes:
 
La Bazoque
Caligny
Cerisy-Belle-Étoile
La Chapelle-au-Moine
La Chapelle-Biche
Le Châtellier
Flers (partly)
La Lande-Patry
Landisacq
Moncy
Saint-Clair-de-Halouze
Saint-Paul
Saint-Pierre-d'Entremont

References

Cantons of Orne